Tell Them, I Am is an interview podcast hosted and created by Misha Euceph, featuring all Muslim voices. The podcast is about the small moments that define who we are and who we are not.

Background 
The podcast features stories from actors, performers, athletes, artists, and activists. The first season of the podcast was launched on the first day of Ramadan in 2019, and the second in Ramadan 2021.  The podcast produced episodes on a daily basis throughout Ramadan. The podcast is presented by the Obamas’ production company, Higher Ground, as a Spotify Original, and produced by Dustlight Productions. Misha Euceph is the creator, host, and executive producer of the podcast and the founder of Dustlight Productions. Euceph begins each episode with a short story about herself. The podcast has interviewed musical guests such as Mvstermind, Yuna, and Zakir Hussain. Other guests have included Alia Shawkat, Ramy Youssef, and Tan France.

References

External links 
 

2019 podcast debuts
Audio podcasts
Religion and spirituality podcasts
Interview podcasts
American podcasts

Islamic podcasts